The Rockville LP is the eighth studio album by American alternative rock group O.A.R. (Of A Revolution). It was released June 10, 2014 by Vanguard Records. This is their first album on the label.

Reception
The album debuted at No. 13 on Billboard 200, and No. 6 on Top Rock Albums, selling around 18,000 in the first week. The album has sold 55,000 copies in the United States as of July 2016.

Track listing

Personnel
O.A.R.
 Marc Roberge – vocals, guitar
 Richard On – guitar, backing vocals
 Benj Gershman – bass
 Jerry DePizzo – saxophone, guitar
 Chris Culos – drums

Additional personnel
 Mikel Paris – keyboards, percussion, backing vocals
 Jon Lampley – trumpet, sousaphone
 Gregg Wattenberg – guitar, piano, bass
 Nathan Chapman – guitar, backing vocals
 Stephanie Chapman – backing vocals
 Ian Driscoll – accordion, percussion
 Derek Fuhrmann – guitar, programming, backing vocals
 Jeffrey Allen – upright bass
 Dave Eggar – cello
 Dan White – baritone saxophone
 Mark Williams – guitar
 Kevin Kadish – guitar, programming
 Todd Clark – piano, backing vocals
 Nelly Joy – backing vocals
 Gunnar Olsen – drums
 John AliCastro – backing vocals
 Michael Lauri – backing vocals
 Mia Wattenberg – backing vocals
 Katie Kresek – backing vocals

Charts

References

O.A.R. albums
2014 albums